Carousel Kings is an American pop punk band from Lancaster, Pennsylvania, United States, formed in late 2008 by founding member David Alexander. They started their career on CI Records and are currently signed to Victory Records. Their Victory Records debut album, Charm City, was released on February 10, 2017, entering the iTunes rock charts at number 14.

History
Carousel Kings began in late 2008/early 2009 with the release of their EP Here Comes Trouble. They made the release free to the public to try and gain as much attention as possible.  The band self-released their first unsigned full-length album titled Speak Frantic in 2010 and toured unsigned DIY with other bands such as Major League and So Many Ways. They opened for numerous national acts locally in their hometown of Lancaster such as Sky Eats Airplane, Alesana , and The Bled gaining the attention of long time manager /owner of CI Records Jeremy Weiss. In March 2012 the band removed Speak Frantic from online outlets , and recorded and added more songs to create and release their first Indie Label album titled A Slice Of Heaven on CI Records out of their hometown in Lancaster. They then toured relentlessly with bands like Major League , Darling Parade, Better Off , City Lights, We Were Sharks , Rust Belt Lights , Auburn , One Year Later.   In November 2012 the band released an EP titled Road Warrior along with a music video for the song. Two years later the band released their third album titled Unity .  They toured the United States and Japan/China as well as appeared on the 2012 and 2015 Vans Warped Tour while being signed to CI Records. Carousel Kings signed to Victory Records and released their third full-length album, Charm City. The album art was done by artist from India Archan Nair. CK did another round of Warped in 2017 as well as Japan , and multiple US and CAN dates with bands such as Our Last Night, A Loss For Words, My Ticket Hone, Knockout Kid, Count To Four, We Were Sharks , Abandoned By Bears, Badcase, Survay Says, Keep Flying , Picture Perfect , The Pink Spiders , GutterLIFE, Post Season, Old Again, Altars, The Vegas Wakeup, Freshman 15, Everybody Run, Lions Lions, For the Win.

Band members
David Alexander (vocals)
Will Barovick (guitar, vocals)
Danny Wilkins (drums)
Cody Williams (bass, vocals)
Kyle Fisher (guitar)

Past members
Andrew Zell (Bass/Guitar)
Luke Harvey (Guitar/Vocals)
Jarrod Galler (Drums)
Max Fastnacht (Drums/Guitar)
Jarrod Shirley (Guitar)
Kyle Cater (Guitar)
Wes Good (Guitar) 
Brad Herr (Guitar)
Kyle Salaga (Bass)
Carmen Carangi (Guitar/Vocals)
Matthew Bozievich (Bass)
Clinton Tustin (Touring Guitar)

Discography

References

Musical groups established in 2009
Musical groups from Pennsylvania
Victory Records artists